Bela Vista is an Italian neighborhood in São Paulo, Brazil.

Bela Vista may also refer to

Places

Brazil
Bela Vista, Mato Grosso do Sul
Bela Vista, Rio Grande do Sul, a neighborhood of Porto Alegre
Bela Vista da Caroba, Paraná
Bela Vista de Goiás, Goiás
Bela Vista de Minas, Minas Gerais
Bela Vista do Maranhão, Maranhão
Bela Vista do Paraíso, Paraná
Bela Vista do Piauí, Piauí
Bela Vista do Toldo, Santa Catarina
São Sebastião da Bela Vista, Minas Gerais

Other countries
Bela Vista, Angola
Bela Vista, São Tomé and Príncipe
Bela Vista Park, Lisbon, Portugal

Other uses
Bela Vista (Lisbon Metro), a railway station in Lisbon, Portugal
Bela Vista (São Paulo Metro), a railway station under construction in São Paulo, Brazil
Bela Vista Futebol Clube, a Brazilian football club

See also
Bella Vista (disambiguation)
Bellavista (disambiguation)